Maupuk is a seal hunting technique used by the Inuit (formerly known as Eskimo). They assign dogs to search for seal breathing holes and wait for the seals to emerge.

References 

Inuit culture
Seal hunting